Ahmed bin Aqil al-Khateeb a Saudi Arabian bureaucrat who has been serving as Minister of Tourism of Saudi Arabia since January 2019. He previously led the country's General Entertainment Authority as its inaugural president between May 2016 and June 2018 and prior to which was the Minister of Health from 2014 till 2016. He is also a former advisor at the Saudi Royal Court and has served as the chairman of Saudi Arabian Military Industries as well as the Saudi Fund for Development.

Early life and career
Al Khateeb was born in Riyadh in 1965. He graduated with a BA in Business Administration from King Saud University, and subsequently gained a diploma in Wealth Management from Dalhousie University in Canada.

In 1992, Al Khateeb joined Riyad Bank and worked on the establishment of its Customer Investment department. He worked for eleven years in different departments of the firm. In 2003, he joined SABB Bank and participated in the establishment of Islamic banking (Amanah) before moving to SABB's Private Services division as a general manager.

In 2006, he established Jadwa Investment Company and later joined the Court of Crown Prince Mohammed bin Salman as an advisor, counseling the Minister of Defense and the manager of the Ministry of Defense development project. Al Khateeb then moved to work as an advisor in the Saudi Royal Court.

In June 2022, he was recognized by the International Hospitality Institute on the Global 100 in Hospitality, a list featuring the 100 Most Powerful People in Global Hospitality.

Current positions
 Minister of Tourism
 Chairman of board of directors for the Saudi Arabian Military Industries (SAMI)
 Heads the committee of Quality of Life Program
 Chairman of board of directors for the Saudi Fund for Development
 Advisor to the Council of Ministers General Secretariat
 Advisor to the Minister of Defense

Membership
 Secretary General and member of the board of directors for Diriyah Gate Development Authority
 Board member at the General Authority for Military Industries 
 Board member at the Council of Economic and Development Affairs
 Board member at the Public Investment Fund
 Board member at the National Development Fund

Previous positions
 Chairman of Board of Directors for the Kingdom's General Entertainment Authority (2015-2018)
 Minister of Health (2015)
 Established Jadwa Investment Company (2006)
 Advisor to Crown Prince at the Royal Court
 Establishment of the Islamic Banking (Amanah)- SABB Bank (2003)
 Establishment of the Customer Investment Department at Bank of Riyadh (1992)
 General Manager of Private Services at SABB Bank

References

1965 births
Living people
King Saud University alumni
Dalhousie University alumni
Ahmad
Government ministers of Saudi Arabia
 
Saudi Arabian bankers